Kalamna is a local urban rail station in vicinity of Nagpur in Maharashtra lies on Howrah–Nagpur–Mumbai line.

Location 
It is 7 km from Nagpur Junction and 3 km from Itwari Junction.

References

External links 

Railway stations in Nagpur district
Nagpur SEC railway division